Altuve is a surname. Notable people with the surname include:

José Altuve (born 1990), Venezuelan baseball player
Olimpia Altuve (1891–?), Guatemalan scientist
Oriana Altuve (born 1992), Venezuelan footballer

See also
Altube

Spanish-language surnames